Harpendyreus marungensis, the central mountain blue, is a butterfly in the family Lycaenidae. It is found in Uganda, the Democratic Republic of the Congo, Rwanda, Kenya and Tanzania. The habitat consists of montane grassland, moist savanna and the edges of roads in forests.

Subspecies
Harpendyreus marungensis marungensis (Democratic Republic of the Congo: south-east to Tanganika, south-western Tanzania)
Harpendyreus marungensis mangalisae Kielland, 1986 (Tanzania: Mpapwa district and north of the Ruaha Gorge)
Harpendyreus marungensis wollastoni (Bethune-Baker, 1926) (Uganda, Rwanda, western Kenya)

References

Butterflies described in 1924
Harpendyreus